James Gibb Ross (18 April 1819 – 1 October 1888) was a Canadian merchant and politician from the province of Quebec.

Born in Carluke, a village of South Lanarkshire, Scotland, Ross emigrated to Canada in 1832 with his brother, John Ross, settling in Quebec City. After briefly attending a private school, he started working within his uncle's, James and Thomas Gibb, wholesale grocery business, James Gibb & Company. He eventually started his own business with his brother as a grocery importer and trading in lumber.

He twice ran unsuccessfully as the Conservative candidate for the House of Commons of Canada for the electoral district of Quebec-Centre in the 1872 and 1878 election. In 1884, he was summoned to the Senate of Canada for the senatorial division of The Laurentides, Quebec on the advice of Prime Minister John A. Macdonald. He served until his death in 1888.  Ross was buried in Mount Hermon Cemetery in Sillery, on 4 October 1888.

References
 
 

1819 births
1888 deaths
Candidates in the 1872 Canadian federal election
Canadian senators from Quebec
Conservative Party of Canada (1867–1942) senators
Scottish emigrants to pre-Confederation Quebec
People from Carluke
Anglophone Quebec people
Immigrants to Lower Canada
Burials at Mount Hermon Cemetery